The arrondissement of Montbard is an arrondissement of France in the Côte-d'Or department in the Bourgogne-Franche-Comté region. It has 252 communes.

Composition

The communes of the arrondissement of Montbard, and their INSEE codes, are:

 Aignay-le-Duc (21004)
 Aisey-sur-Seine (21006)
 Aisy-sous-Thil (21007)
 Alise-Sainte-Reine (21008)
 Ampilly-les-Bordes (21011)
 Ampilly-le-Sec (21012)
 Arnay-sous-Vitteaux (21024)
 Arrans (21025)
 Asnières-en-Montagne (21026)
 Athie (21029)
 Autricourt (21034)
 Avosnes (21040)
 Baigneux-les-Juifs (21043)
 Balot (21044)
 Bard-lès-Époisses (21047)
 Beaulieu (21052)
 Beaunotte (21055)
 Belan-sur-Ource (21058)
 Bellenod-sur-Seine (21061)
 Beneuvre (21063)
 Benoisey (21064)
 Beurizot (21069)
 Billy-lès-Chanceaux (21075)
 Bissey-la-Côte (21077)
 Bissey-la-Pierre (21078)
 Boudreville (21090)
 Bouix (21093)
 Boussey (21097)
 Boux-sous-Salmaise (21098)
 Brain (21100)
 Braux (21101)
 Brémur-et-Vaurois (21104)
 Brianny (21108)
 Brion-sur-Ource (21109)
 Buffon (21114)
 Buncey (21115)
 Bure-les-Templiers (21116)
 Busseaut (21117)
 Bussy-le-Grand (21122)
 Buxerolles (21123)
 Cérilly (21125)
 Chambain (21129)
 Chamesson (21134)
 Champ-d'Oiseau (21137)
 Champeau-en-Morvan (21139)
 Champrenault (21141)
 Channay (21143)
 Charencey (21144)
 Charigny (21145)
 Charny (21147)
 Charrey-sur-Seine (21149)
 Chassey (21151)
 Châtillon-sur-Seine (21154)
 Chaugey (21157)
 La Chaume (21159)
 Chaume-lès-Baigneux (21160)
 Chaumont-le-Bois (21161)
 Chemin-d'Aisey (21165)
 Chevannay (21168)
 Clamerey (21177)
 Corpoyer-la-Chapelle (21197)
 Corrombles (21198)
 Corsaint (21199)
 Coulmier-le-Sec (21201)
 Courban (21202)
 Courcelles-Frémoy (21203)
 Courcelles-lès-Montbard (21204)
 Courcelles-lès-Semur (21205)
 Crépand (21212)
 Dampierre-en-Montagne (21224)
 Darcey (21226)
 Dompierre-en-Morvan (21232)
 Duesme (21235)
 Échalot (21237)
 Époisses (21247)
 Éringes (21248)
 Essarois (21250)
 Étais (21252)
 Étalante (21253)
 Étormay (21257)
 Étrochey (21258)
 Fain-lès-Montbard (21259)
 Fain-lès-Moutiers (21260)
 Faverolles-lès-Lucey (21262)
 Flavigny-sur-Ozerain (21271)
 Fontaines-en-Duesmois (21276)
 Fontaines-les-Sèches (21279)
 Fontangy (21280)
 Forléans (21282)
 Fresnes (21287)
 Frôlois (21288)
 Genay (21291)
 Gevrolles (21296)
 Gissey-le-Vieil (21298)
 Gissey-sous-Flavigny (21299)
 Gomméville (21302)
 Les Goulles (21303)
 Grancey-sur-Ource (21305)
 Grésigny-Sainte-Reine (21307)
 Grignon (21308)
 Griselles (21309)
 Gurgy-la-Ville (21312)
 Gurgy-le-Château (21313)
 Hauteroche (21314)
 Jailly-les-Moulins (21321)
 Jeux-lès-Bard (21324)
 Jours-lès-Baigneux (21326)
 Juillenay (21328)
 Juilly (21329)
 Lacour-d'Arcenay (21335)
 Laignes (21336)
 Lantilly (21341)
 Larrey (21343)
 Leuglay (21346)
 Lignerolles (21350)
 Louesme (21357)
 Lucenay-le-Duc (21358)
 Lucey (21359)
 Magny-Lambert (21364)
 Magny-la-Ville (21365)
 Maisey-le-Duc (21372)
 Marcellois (21377)
 Marcenay (21378)
 Marcigny-sous-Thil (21380)
 Marcilly-et-Dracy (21381)
 Marigny-le-Cahouët (21386)
 Marmagne (21389)
 Massingy (21393)
 Massingy-lès-Semur (21394)
 Massingy-lès-Vitteaux (21395)
 Mauvilly (21396)
 Menesble (21402)
 Ménétreux-le-Pitois (21404)
 Meulson (21410)
 Millery (21413)
 Minot (21415)
 Missery (21417)
 Moitron (21418)
 Molesme (21419)
 Molphey (21422)
 Montbard (21425)
 Montberthault (21426)
 Montigny-Montfort (21429)
 Montigny-Saint-Barthélemy (21430)
 Montigny-sur-Armançon (21431)
 Montigny-sur-Aube (21432)
 Montlay-en-Auxois (21434)
 Montliot-et-Courcelles (21435)
 Montmoyen (21438)
 Mosson (21444)
 La Motte-Ternant (21445)
 Moutiers-Saint-Jean (21446)
 Mussy-la-Fosse (21448)
 Nan-sous-Thil (21449)
 Nesle-et-Massoult (21451)
 Nicey (21454)
 Nod-sur-Seine (21455)
 Nogent-lès-Montbard (21456)
 Noidan (21457)
 Noiron-sur-Seine (21460)
 Normier (21463)
 Obtrée (21465)
 Oigny (21466)
 Origny (21470)
 Orret (21471)
 Planay (21484)
 Poinçon-lès-Larrey (21488)
 Poiseul-la-Ville-et-Laperrière (21490)
 Pont-et-Massène (21497)
 Posanges (21498)
 Pothières (21499)
 Pouillenay (21500)
 Précy-sous-Thil (21505)
 Prusly-sur-Ource (21510)
 Puits (21511)
 Quemigny-sur-Seine (21514)
 Quincerot (21516)
 Quincy-le-Vicomte (21518)
 Recey-sur-Ource (21519)
 Riel-les-Eaux (21524)
 La Roche-en-Brenil (21525)
 Rochefort-sur-Brévon (21526)
 La Roche-Vanneau (21528)
 Roilly (21529)
 Rougemont (21530)
 Rouvray (21531)
 Saffres (21537)
 Saint-Andeux (21538)
 Saint-Broing-les-Moines (21543)
 Saint-Didier (21546)
 Sainte-Colombe-en-Auxois (21544)
 Sainte-Colombe-sur-Seine (21545)
 Saint-Euphrône (21547)
 Saint-Germain-de-Modéon (21548)
 Saint-Germain-le-Rocheux (21549)
 Saint-Germain-lès-Senailly (21550)
 Saint-Hélier (21552)
 Saint-Marc-sur-Seine (21557)
 Saint-Mesmin (21563)
 Saint-Rémy (21568)
 Saint-Thibault (21576)
 Salmaise (21580)
 Saulieu (21584)
 Savoisy (21594)
 Seigny (21598)
 Semond (21602)
 Semur-en-Auxois (21603)
 Senailly (21604)
 Sincey-lès-Rouvray (21608)
 Souhey (21612)
 Source-Seine (21551)
 Soussey-sur-Brionne (21613)
 Terrefondrée (21626)
 Thenissey (21627)
 Thoires (21628)
 Thoisy-la-Berchère (21629)
 Thorey-sous-Charny (21633)
 Thoste (21635)
 Torcy-et-Pouligny (21640)
 Touillon (21641)
 Toutry (21642)
 Uncey-le-Franc (21649)
 Le Val-Larrey (21272)
 Vannaire (21653)
 Vanvey (21655)
 Velogny (21662)
 Venarey-les-Laumes (21663)
 Verdonnet (21664)
 Verrey-sous-Salmaise (21670)
 Vertault (21671)
 Vesvres (21672)
 Veuxhaulles-sur-Aube (21674)
 Vic-de-Chassenay (21676)
 Vic-sous-Thil (21678)
 Vieux-Château (21681)
 Villaines-en-Duesmois (21685)
 Villaines-les-Prévôtes (21686)
 Villargoix (21687)
 Villars-et-Villenotte (21689)
 Villeberny (21690)
 Villedieu (21693)
 Villeferry (21694)
 La Villeneuve-les-Convers (21695)
 Villeneuve-sous-Charigny (21696)
 Villers-Patras (21700)
 Villiers-le-Duc (21704)
 Villotte-sur-Ource (21706)
 Villy-en-Auxois (21707)
 Viserny (21709)
 Vitteaux (21710)
 Vix (21711)
 Voulaines-les-Templiers (21717)

History

The arrondissement of Semur-en-Auxois was created in 1800. The subprefecture was moved to Montbard in 1926.

As a result of the reorganisation of the cantons of France which came into effect in 2015, the borders of the cantons are no longer related to the borders of the arrondissements. The cantons of the arrondissement of Montbard were, as of January 2015:

 Aignay-le-Duc
 Baigneux-les-Juifs
 Châtillon-sur-Seine
 Laignes
 Montbard
 Montigny-sur-Aube
 Précy-sous-Thil
 Recey-sur-Ource
 Saulieu
 Semur-en-Auxois
 Venarey-les-Laumes
 Vitteaux

References

Montbard